Dynamite Ranch is a 1932 American Western film directed by Forrest Sheldon and written by Barry Barrington. The film stars Ken Maynard, Ruth Hall, Alan Roscoe, Martha Mattox, Arthur Hoyt and Albert J. Smith. The film was produced by K.B.S. (Burt Kelly, Sam Bischoff and William Saal) Productions  released on July 31, 1932, by Sono Art-World Wide Pictures.

The film takes place during modern times and features a costume ball and an automobile chase; there is no dynamite featured in the film. Dynamite Ranch was remade as Unconquered Bandit (1935).

Plot
Blaze Howell stops what he believes is a train robbery, but it is revealed to be a welcoming joke to visitors from the East. It is discovered that during the fake robbery, a real robbery has occurred that involved the death of a guard.  Howell is later accused of breaking into a safe, and discovery of his glove at the scene makes things worse for him. Aided by Smithers, Howell sets a trap and captures the real culprit.

Cast           
Ken Maynard as Blaze Howell
Ruth Hall as Doris Collins
Alan Roscoe as Park Owens
Martha Mattox as Aunt Sarah Collins
Arthur Hoyt as Smithers
Albert J. Smith as Red
George C. Pearce as Andrew Collins

References

External links
 

1932 films
American Western (genre) films
1932 Western (genre) films
Films directed by Forrest Sheldon
American black-and-white films
1930s English-language films
1930s American films